This is a list of diplomatic missions in Nigeria. There are 105 embassies/high commissions in Abuja, and many countries maintain consulates in other Nigerian cities (not including honorary consulates).

Diplomatic missions in Abuja

Embassies and High Commissions

Other missions or delegation 
 (Delegation)

Gallery

Consular missions

Calabar 
 (Consulate-General)
 (Consulate)

Kano

Lagos 

 

 (Consulate)

 (Consulate-General)
 (Consulate-General)
 (Consulate-General)
 (Consulate)
 (Consulate)

 (Consulate-General)

 (Consulate-General)
 (Trade Office)

Maiduguri

Kaduna 
 (Liaison office)

Port Harcourt 
 (Liaison office)

Non-resident embassies and high commissions 

 (Cairo)
 (Cairo)
 (Accra)
 (London)
 (Addis Ababa)
 (London)
 (Tripoli)
 (Cairo)
 (Riyadh)
 (Valletta)
 (Addis Ababa)
 (Addis Ababa)
 (Addis Ababa)
 (Addis Ababa)
 (New Delhi)
 (Cairo)
 (Algiers)
 (Singapore)
 (Pretoria)
 (Canberra)

Closed missions

See also 
 Foreign relations of Nigeria

References

External links 
 Nigerian Ministry of Foreign Affairs

Diplomatic missions
Nigeria